Rick Kelly (born 17 January 1983) is an Australian professional racing driver who previously competed in the Supercars Championship. He last drove the No. 15 Ford Mustang GT for Kelly Racing. Previously, he drove for the HSV Dealer Team with whom he won the Bathurst 1000 alongside Greg Murphy in 2003 and 2004. In 2006, Kelly extended his success by winning the V8 Supercar Championship for the HSV Dealer Team. His older brother Todd Kelly was also a racing driver who won the Bathurst 1000 in 2005. His parents John and Margaret Kelly formed Kelly Racing in 2009 with Rick and Todd Kelly as lead drivers, expanding to a 4 car operation.

2006 Supercar Championship
In 2006, Kelly won the Australian V8 Supercar Championship Series after being one of the most consistent performers throughout the season. The victory, however, was not without its share of controversy. Despite not winning a single round overall (though he did win an individual race), or scoring a pole position in any individual race, Kelly entered the final round of the series at Phillip Island seven points ahead of his nearest competitor, Craig Lowndes, (who had won four rounds) due to consistent high points finishes in all twelve of the previous 2006 rounds.

Coming into the third and final race of the round, Lowndes had managed to pull back the deficit to be even on points with Kelly, meaning that the driver out of the two who finished first would clinch the championship.  Two laps into the final race, Kelly collided with Lowndes, who then slid into Todd Kelly.  Damage to Lowndes’s car resulted in him finishing 29th, whereas Rick Kelly finished 18th and was awarded the series title despite not having won a single round.

Charitable work
Kelly has joined other publicly known figures in support of the "Oscar's Law" campaign, a protest against the factory farming of companion animals. The campaign is named after a neglected dog found in central Victoria, Australia, and was launched in 2010. The list of supporters includes singers Kate Ceberano, Jon Stevens, and Sia. Kelly not only appears on the campaign's website, but he has also promoted the campaign on his Twitter account.

Career results

Career summary

Supercars Championship results

Complete Bathurst 1000 results

References

External links
 Official Rick Kelly Website 
 Rick Kelly Nissan Motorsport Profile
 Rick Kelly V8 Supercars Official Profile
Driver Database profile
Profile on Racing Reference

1983 births
Bathurst 1000 winners
Formula Ford drivers
Formula Holden drivers
Living people
People from Mildura
Racing drivers from Victoria (Australia)
Supercars Championship drivers
R-Motorsport drivers
Kelly Racing drivers
Nismo drivers
Aston Martin Racing drivers